The Security Storage and Safe Deposit Company Warehouse is a historic storage facility at 517-523 Front Street in Norfolk, Virginia.  It is a large concrete structure with four levels of storage, and was built in 1916.  It is a rare survivor in an area that once had many warehouses, and is distinctive for its subdued decorations, which differentiate it from otherwise nondescript brick or concrete warehouses.

The warehouse was listed on the National Register of Historic Places in 2014.

See also
National Register of Historic Places listings in Norfolk, Virginia

References

Industrial buildings and structures on the National Register of Historic Places in Virginia
Industrial buildings completed in 1916
Buildings and structures in Norfolk, Virginia
National Register of Historic Places in Norfolk, Virginia
Warehouses on the National Register of Historic Places